This is a comprehensive listing that highlights significant achievements and milestones based upon Panamanian singles charts. The Panamanian charts began publishing since 1989 on the Ecuador newspaper El Siglo de Torreón through United Press International (until 1996), and Notimex (from 1998 to 2005). Currently, the Panamanian charts now are published by Monitor Latino since December 5, 2016, and is currently the standard popular music chart in Panama. This list spans the period from the issue dated January 27, 1989 to present.

Song milestones

Most weeks at number one

Most weeks at number two (without hitting number one)

Most total weeks on the charts

Note: The year displayed is the year the songs ended their respective chart runs.

Number-one debuts

Since its inception in December 2016, at least one song has debuted at number one per year. 2021 holds the record for most debuts at number one in a calendar year, with five. In Panama, five artists in history have more than one song that debuted at number one. Maluma leads with six songs; J Balvin, Joey Montana and Carlos Vives debuted with three songs; while Sebastián Yatra has debuted with two songs.

Longest climbs to number one
 29th week – Sech – "Sal y Perrea" (2021–22)
 23rd week – Kenny Man and Sebastián Yatra – "Ni Gucci Ni Prada" (2018)
 16th week – Sech featuring Darell – "Otro Trago" (2019)
 14th week – Nicky Jam and J Balvin – "X" (2018)
 12th week – Becky G and Bad Bunny – "Mayores" (2017–18), Myke Towers – "Diosa" (2020)
 10th week – Karol G and Nicki Minaj – "Tusa" (2019–20)

Artist achievements

Most number-one singles

Most cumulative weeks at number one

Most consecutive years charting a number-one single

Most number-one singles in a calendar year

Most number-one debuts

Simultaneously occupying the top two positions

 J Balvin:
December 5–26, 2016
"Safari" (featuring Pharrell Williams, Bia and Sky)
"Otra Vez" (Zion & Lennox featuring J Balvin)
July 9, 2018
"No es justo" (with Zion & Lennox)
"X" (with Nicky Jam)

 Karol G:
May 9, 2022
"Provenza"
"Mamiii" (with Becky G)

Self-replacement at number one
 Karol G – "Mamiii" (with Becky G) → "Provenza" (May 9, 2022)
 Bizarrap – "Quevedo: Bzrp Music Sessions, Vol. 52" (with Quevedo) → "Shakira: Bzrp Music Sessions, Vol. 53" (with Shakira) (January 9, 2023)

References 

Panamanian music-related lists
Panama